Acceglio (Vivaro-Alpine: Acelh) is a comune (municipality) in the Province of Cuneo in the Italian region Piedmont.

Acceglio borders the following municipalities: Argentera, Bellino, Canosio, Larche (France), Meyronnes (France), Prazzo, and Saint-Paul-sur-Ubaye (France).

Tourism
The territory of Acceglio, thanks to its intact natural environment, is a destination for hiking, mountain biking and mountaineering. To support those activities, Acceglio has several alpine huts:
 Rifugio Campo Base
 Rifugio Stroppia
 Bivacco Barenghi
 Bivacco Enrico e Mario

Frazioni
Acceglio has 11 frazioni whose elevation above sea level varies between approximately :
 Villar (1375 m)
 Ponte Maira (1404 m)
 Saretto (1533 m)
 Chiappera (1614 m) (pictured)
 Bargia (1401 m)
 Lausetto (1510 m)
 Colombata (1576 m)
 Frere (1196 m)
 Gheit (1372 m)
 Chialvetta (1494 m)
 Pratorotondo (1639 m)

References

External links

 Official website
 www.acceglio.com/ 

Cities and towns in Piedmont
Articles which contain graphical timelines